Walter Gunnyon (16 May 1895 – 27 December 1972) was an Australian rules footballer who played with South Fremantle in the West Australian Football League and St Kilda in the VFL in the 1920s.

Playing career
Gunnyon played four seasons with South Fremantle in the West Australian Football League, playing 54 games. He represented Western Australia in the 1921 Perth Carnival.

In 1922 Gunnyon transferred to St Kilda in the VFL going on to play 63 games for the club, the latter games in an unfamiliar defensive role. 

Gunnyon was appointed as captain / coach of the Camberwell Football Club in 1928.

He moved across to newly admitted VFA club, Oakleigh in 1929 and played in their 1930 premiership team.

War service
Gunnyon enlisted with the Australian Imperial Force in November 1915, serving in France.

Notes

References
 'Leander', "Personal Stories of Leading Footballers of the Day: A Champion from West Australia: "Wally" Gunnyon a Real Discovery for St. Kilda", The (Melbourne) Herald, (Saturday, 1 July 1922), p.5.</ref>

External links

The Australasian: 1929 - Oakleigh FC - Team Photo
Weekly Times: 1929 - Oakleigh FC - Team Photo

1895 births
1972 deaths
People from Stawell, Victoria
Australian Rules footballers: place kick exponents
South Fremantle Football Club players
St Kilda Football Club players
Oakleigh Football Club players
Camberwell Football Club players
Camberwell Football Club coaches
Australian rules footballers from Fremantle
Australian military personnel of World War I
Military personnel from Western Australia